ARTDOC (Army Training and Doctrine Command) is a research-oriented formation in the Bangladesh Army. It is headquartered at Momenshahi Cantonment, Mymensingh. It is charged with overseeing training evaluation and reforms; weapon, equipment and force modernization; development of concepts and doctrine revision. It consists of its headquarters, battle group and all the training institutions of the Bangladesh Army. The first General Officer Commanding of ARTDOC was Major General Muhammad Zia-Ur-Rahman, ndc, psc,

The current General Officer Commanding of ARTDOC is Lieutenant General Ahmed Tabrez Shams Chowdhury.

Mission 
The official mission statement for ARTDOC states:
To prepare Bangladesh Army for war and be the architect of its future.

History 
In the past, the Military Training (MT) Directorate at Army Headquarters (AHQ) was responsible for carrying out different types of research works related to training of the Bangladesh Army. However, due to limited resources and a manpower shortage, they couldn't do any comprehensive research and study in the field of doctrine and development.

To strengthen the research and development capability for strategic, operational, tactical and technological enhancement, and to keep up with continual changes in the complexities of the battlefield scenario, rapid technological advancement Bangladesh Army raised ARTDOC on 25 July 2007 to develop its training and operational standards with special emphasis on research and development in the related fields.

Training Institutions 
ARTDOC acts as the nodal agency of all institutional training. Bangladesh Army has 20 different training to train officers and men of all arms and services.
 Artillery Centre and School
 Armoured Corps Centre and School
 East Bengal Regimental Center
 Engineer Center and School of Military Engineering
 Signals Training Center and School
 Army Medical Corps Centre and School
 School of Electrical Mechanical Engineering
 Ordnance Center and School
 Army Service Corps Centre and School
 School of Military Intelligence
 Army School of Music
 Army School of Physical Training and Sports
 Bangladesh Institute of Peace Support Operation Training
 Bangladesh Infantry Regimental Centre
 School of Infantry and Tactics
 Bangladesh Military Academy
 Army School of Education and Administration 
 Corps of Military Police Centre and school 
Non- Commissioned Officer's Academy 
 403 Battle Group

Visits

References

Bangladesh Army
2007 establishments in Bangladesh